Hassan Bouba is a minister of livestock and animal health in the Central African Republic and general of the Union for Peace in the Central African Republic armed group.

Life 
He used to work for Chadian intelligence. In 2010 he contacted with Baba Laddé, leader of Central African Republic rebel group Popular Front for Recovery. After fall of François Bozizé he joined Central African rebels.

In 2016 he became a political coordination of the Union for Peace in the Central African Republic. In 2017 he allegedly ordered murder of four child soldiers from UPC armed group. He also participated in the 2018 Alindao massacre. On 3 December 2020 he was appointed minister of livestock by president Touadera. In September 2021 he reportedly created splinter faction from UPC.

On 19 November 2021 he was arrested. Country's Special Criminal Court charged him with war crimes stemming from a 2018 massacre of 112 civilians. The government released him on 26 November.

References 

Central African Republic military personnel
Living people
African warlords
People of the Central African Republic Civil War
Year of birth missing (living people)